Bernadette M. Meehan (born 1975) is an American diplomat who is the current United States Ambassador to Chile. She previously worked as chief international officer for the Obama Foundation. She also served as a spokesperson for the United States National Security Council in the Obama Administration.

Early life and education

Meehan was raised in Pleasantville, New York and graduated from Kennedy Catholic High School in Somers. She attended Boston College, graduating with a Bachelor of Arts degree in political science. After graduation she worked on Wall Street, first at JPMorgan Chase and then Lehman Brothers. She later joined the United States Foreign Service.

Career

Meehan joined the United States Department of State as a Foreign Service officer in 2004, and began her new career as a consular officer at the U.S. embassy in Bogota, Colombia. She survived a kidnapping and physical assault by armed men in Bogota in April 2006. Two of the perpetrators were arrested and sentenced to ten years in jail, while two perpetrators were never found.

She served in Colombia for two years before volunteering to serve in Iraq. She worked at the U.S. Embassy in Baghdad from 2006 to 2007 as a Consular Officer, and for several months as Special Assistant to Ambassador Zalmay Khalilzad. She was wounded in Baghdad, by a rocket fired by an Iran-backed militia.

In September 2007 Meehan left Iraq to study Arabic at the Department of State's Foreign Service Institute in Virginia to prepare for her next tour as the public affairs officer at the U.S. Consulate General in Dubai in the United Arab Emirates.

Meehan was selected in 2007 as a Powell Fellow, recognized as one of the 12 most promising future leaders in the Department of State. 

In 2010 she returned to Washington, D.C. to work as a State Department "Line Officer", advancing the Secretary of State’s overseas travel. She then become one of two Special Assistants to the Secretary of State. In 2012, Meehan was detailed to the White House National Security Council (NSC) and in 2014 she became the spokeswoman for the National Security Council.

Meehan left the NSC in 2015 to become an adjunct professor and State Department resident fellow at Georgetown University’s Institute for the Study of Diplomacy in the Edmund A. Walsh School of Foreign Service. She was recalled to the NSC to oversee the planning for President Obama's historic trip to Havana, Cuba. According to The New York Times, her appointment to this position reflected the importance the President put on the trip and the complicated nature of planning the visit. 

In February 2017, Meehan departed the Foreign Service to serve as the Chief International Officer at the Obama Foundation. The Obama Foundation is a Chicago-based nonprofit organization founded by President and Mrs. Obama that seeks out to inspire, empower and connect people to change their world for the better. In this role, she was responsible for developing and overseeing all international programs for the Obama Foundation, including the Obama Foundation Scholars; Leaders Africa program; Leaders Asia-Pacific program; and Leaders Europe program.

Meehan served on the board of advisors for Georgetown University's Institute for the Study of Diplomacy, within the Walsh School of Foreign Service. She also served on the board of advisors for Hostage US, a non-profit organization that supports families of Americans taken hostage abroad and supports hostages when they return home.

Biden administration

On July 9, 2021, President Joe Biden nominated Meehan to be the next United States ambassador to Chile. On March 15, 2022, hearings on her nomination were held before the Senate Foreign Relations Committee. The committee favorably reported her nomination on May 18, 2022. On July 20, 2022, the United States Senate confirmed her nomination by a 51–44 vote. She was sworn in on August 29, 2022 and presented her credentials to President Gabriel Boric on September 30, 2022.

Personal life
Meehan speaks Spanish and Arabic.

References

External links

Join President Obama in Berlin: Join President Obama in Berlin:
President Obama's Visit to Indonesia: President Obama's Visit to Indonesia
President Obama's Visit with Emerging Leaders in Singapore: President Obama’s Visit with Emerging Leaders in Singapore
President Obama's Visit to New Zealand: President Obama's Visit to New Zealand
The Obama Foundation Scholars Program: The Obama Foundation Scholars Program

1975 births
Living people
21st-century American diplomats
Ambassadors of the United States to Chile
American financial analysts
American women ambassadors
Morrissey College of Arts & Sciences alumni
Obama administration personnel
Political spokespersons
United States Foreign Service personnel
United States National Security Council staffers
Women financial analysts
American women diplomats